Cherknukhi is a rural locality (a village) in Polozovoskoye Rural Settlement, Bolshesosnovsky District, Perm Krai, Russia. The population was 45 as of 2010. There are 4 streets.

Geography 
Cherknukhi is located on the Poludennaya River, 54 km south of Bolshaya Sosnova (the district's administrative centre) by road. Verkh-Shestaya is the nearest rural locality.

References 

Rural localities in Bolshesosnovsky District